Valun is a rural locality (a village) in Megrinskoye Rural Settlement, Chagodoshchensky District, Vologda Oblast, Russia. The population was 13 as of 2002.

Geography 
Chagoda is the nearest rural locality.

References 

Rural localities in Chagodoshchensky District